In molecular biology, deleted in lymphocytic leukemia 1 (non-protein coding), also known as DLEU1, is a long non-coding RNA. In humans it is located on chromosome 13q14. The DLEU1 gene was originally identified as a potential tumour suppressor gene and is often deleted in patients with B-cell chronic lymphocytic leukemia. It was later discovered to be a long non-coding RNA with over 20 different splice variants.

See also 
 Long noncoding RNA

References

Further reading 

 
 
 
 

Non-coding RNA